Walter R. Tkach (February 9, 1917 – October 31, 1989) was an American physician who served as Physician to the President under Richard Nixon from 1969 to 1974.

He died of heart disease on October 31, 1989, in San Diego, California at age 72.

References

1917 births
1989 deaths
United States Air Force generals
Physicians to the President